River Ring is a mixed-use development planned for the Williamsburg neighborhood of Brooklyn in New York City. Two Trees, the project's developer, commissioned a design from BIG and James Corner Field Operations.

Development and history
Consolidated Edison previously occupied the three lots on which River Ring will rise, using them for purposes including oil storage. Two Trees, the project's developer, purchased the lots in 2019 for $150 million. Two Trees first released public renderings of the project's structures in late 2019. The project abuts the Domino Sugar Redevelopment, also a Two Trees development. Part of the Domino project, Domino Park, was designed by James Corner Field Operations; the firm will also design the outdoor portions of River Ring.

The project will have two towers, originally planned to top out at  respectively. Revised plans for the two towers were released in early 2021, increasing the height of one tower to 710 feet and decreasing the other to 560 feet. The project requires rezoning for construction to begin, as zoning currently mandates using the space for commercial or industrial purposes. The project must also go through New York City's Uniform Land Use Review Procedure. An organization, Sustainable Williamsburg, has objected to the rezoning plans. Two Trees anticipates completion by 2027.

Before construction begins, the site will host a miniature golf course and a farm. The golf course opened in July 2021. The development will go before the City Planning Commission on August 16th, beginning a seven-month long review. If the building does not gain approval, Two Trees has said it will sell the site to a logistics company.

Design and usage
The buildings will have approximately 1200 residential units, as well as office space and a YMCA. In addition to the residential structures, the development will include a private park with a beach, designed to soak up floodwater, as the development will sit in a floodplain.

See also
List of tallest buildings in Brooklyn

References

Williamsburg, Brooklyn
Bjarke Ingels buildings
Residential buildings in Brooklyn